The term Asian race (in reference to humans) may refer to:

Asian people
Mongoloid race
Central Asian peoples: Turkic peoples, Iranian peoples.
East Asian peoples: List of Chinese ethnic groups (historical), Sino-Tibetan peoples, Japanese people, Koreans, Mongols
South Asian peoples: Ethnic groups of India, Ethnic groups in Pakistan, Dravidians, Indo-Aryans, Munda people.

See also
Asiatic race (disambiguation)
Asian American
Race and ethnicity in the United States Census
Asian Canadian
Asian Australian

fr:Asiatique (humain)